Bellamira scalaris is a species of beetle in the family Cerambycidae, the only species in the genus Bellamira.

References

Lepturinae
Monotypic Cerambycidae genera